Maszczyk is a Polish surname. Notable people with the surname include:

 Łukasz Maszczyk (born 1984), Polish amateur boxer
 Zygmunt Maszczyk (born 1945), Polish footballer

See also
 

Polish-language surnames